René Gerwig (24 September 1891 – 30 May 1965) was a French racing cyclist. He rode in the 1919 Tour de France.

References

1891 births
1965 deaths
French male cyclists